Ray Daher is a former Lebanon international rugby league footballer who represented Lebanon at the 2000 World Cup.

Background
Daher was born in Australia.

Playing career
Ray captained the Lebanese team in the 2003 Rugby league World sevens in Sydney Australia.

References

Living people
Australian rugby league players
Lebanon national rugby league team players
Rugby league five-eighths
Rugby league locks
Year of birth missing (living people)